Hypericum gnidiifolium is a species of flowering plant in the family Hypericaceae. It is endemic to Ethiopia, where it has been observed at only two locations.  It grows next to streams.

References

gnidiifolium
Endemic flora of Ethiopia
Taxonomy articles created by Polbot